Katrin Jäke (born c. 1975) is a retired German butterfly swimmer who won three silver medals at the 1993 European Aquatics Championships and 2000 FINA World Swimming Championships (25 m). Between 1990 and 1999 she won 12 national titles in butterfly events.

References

1975 births
Living people
German female swimmers
German female butterfly swimmers
Medalists at the FINA World Swimming Championships (25 m)
European Aquatics Championships medalists in swimming
21st-century German women
20th-century German women